Podelmis graphica, is a species of riffle beetle found in Sri Lanka.

It has longitudinal stripes and also has an interrupted tomentum band at the front edge of the pronotum.

References 

Elmidae
Insects of Sri Lanka
Insects described in 1982